Psilochorus hesperus is a spider found in cellars and rock boulder nooks in the Northwestern United States and in British Columbia. Adult males have curved spikes protruding forward from their jaws.

References

External links
Images

Pholcidae
Spiders of North America
Spiders described in 1936